Flag terminology is the nomenclature, or system of terms, used in vexillology, the study of flags, to describe precisely the parts, patterns, and other attributes of flags and their display.

Flag types

Flag elements

Basic patterns
Flags often inherit traits seen in traditional European heraldry designs and as a result patterns often share names.

Techniques in flag display

Illustrations 
Flag illustrations generally depict flags flying from the observer's point of view from left to right, the view known as the obverse (or "front"); the other side is the reverse (or "back").  There are some exceptions, notably some Islamic flags inscribed in Arabic, which is written from right to left; for these the obverse is defined as the side with the hoist to the observer's right.

See also 
 Vexillological symbol

Notes

References

External links

Vexillology
Vexillology
Vexillology
Wikipedia glossaries using description lists